Poulsenia is a monotypic genus of trees in the family Moraceae.  The only species is Poulsenia armata, native to rainforests from Mexico south to Bolivia.

References 

Moraceae
Monotypic Rosales genera
Trees of Peru
Trees of Bolivia
Trees of Panama
Trees of Mexico
Trees of Venezuela
Trees of Ecuador
Trees of Costa Rica
Trees of Nicaragua
Trees of Colombia
Trees of Guatemala
Trees of Brazil
Trees of Belize
Trees of Honduras
Moraceae genera